Arhopala barami is a species of butterfly belonging to the lycaenid family described by George Thomas Bethune-Baker in 1903. It is found in Southeast Asia (Peninsular Malaya, Singapore, Burma, Mergui, Thailand and Borneo).

Subspecies
Arhopala barami barami (Borneo)
Arhopala barami woodii Ollenbach, 1921 (southern Burma, Mergui, southern Thailand)
Arhopala barami penanga Corbet, 1941 (Peninsular Malaysia, Singapore)

References

Arhopala
Butterflies described in 1903
Taxa named by George Thomas Bethune-Baker
Butterflies of Asia